Monica Maria Iacob Ridzi (born 30 June 1977 in Petroşani) is a Romanian politician. She was the head of the youth wing of the Democratic Liberal Party, and a representative in the Chamber of Deputies of Romania since 2008. She is a former member of the Boc cabinet, and was a Member of the European Parliament during 2007–2008.

In February 2015, she received a 5-year prison sentence for abuse of office in relation to the 2009 Youth Day. On December 3, 2015, President Klaus Iohannis rejected Ridzi's pardon plea. In December 2017, she was released from prison, after spending nearly three years incarcerated.

Political career
She became an MEP on 1 January 2007 with the accession of Romania to the European Union, and like other members of the Democratic Liberal Party she was part of the European People's Party–European Democrats.

On 22 December 2008, she was appointed the head of the newly re-founded Ministry of Youth and Sport in the Boc Cabinet. She resigned on 14 July 2009, after being investigated by a parliamentary commission regarding the possible embezzlement of money spent by the Ministry she was running on the Youth Day festivities.

See also 
 List of corruption scandals in Romania

References

External links
 (Former) MEP Profile
European Parliament official photo

1977 births
Living people
Democratic Liberal Party (Romania) politicians
Members of the Chamber of Deputies (Romania)
People from Petroșani
21st-century Romanian women politicians
Democratic Liberal Party (Romania) MEPs
Women MEPs for Romania
MEPs for Romania 2007
MEPs for Romania 2007–2009
Romanian politicians convicted of corruption
Prisoners and detainees of Romania
Romanian prisoners and detainees
Romanian women in business
21st-century Romanian politicians